Fred Whittaker may refer to:

 Fred Whittaker (footballer), English professional footballer
 Fred Whittaker (soccer) (born 1923), Canadian professional soccer player